Diodonopsis is a genus of flowering plants belonging to the family Orchidaceae.

Its native range is Costa Rica to Western South America.

Species
Species:

Diodonopsis anachaeta 
Diodonopsis erinacea 
Diodonopsis hoeijeri 
Diodonopsis pterygiophora 
Diodonopsis pygmaea 
Diodonopsis ramiromedinae

References

Pleurothallidinae
Pleurothallidinae genera